Mariya Aleksandrovna Shalayeva (Russian: Мари́я Алекса́ндровна Шала́ева; born 15 March 1981) is a Russian actress.  Her film credits include I will be near (2012), Mermaid (2007) and Nirvana (2008).

Biography
Mariya was born in Tushino, Moscow. Immediately after graduation, she entered the acting department Russian Academy of Theatre Arts in the workshop of Joseph Raihelgauz. Mariya Shalaeva starred in over a dozen films and television series, including the films The Freshman, Masha, Mermaid, Nirvana.

The leading role in Mermaid brought her many awards and nominations…

In 2004 the actress met film director Sergei Tkachev on a plane to Paris. He was captivated by her beauty and in a week wrote a screenplay special for her. The film was entitled Mariya. This is a story about the girl who went to Paris. The shooting took place in France, including the Louvre (it is very difficult to get permission to shoot in the museum). In 2008, the film became a Russian contender for an Academy Award.

Filmography
 2002 Odyssey 1989 as Cheburashka
 2002 The Freshman as Katya
 2002 The Messenger as episode (cancelled)
 2003 Fireworks as Marina Storozheeva
 2003 Bimmer (film) as girl with telegraph
 2003 March-throw as girlfriend Mashi
 2004 Lord of the ether as Dinka
 2004 Masha as Masha
 2004 Carousel as Sonya
 2005 Night seller as girl Dani
 2006 You do not leave me as Jeanne
 2006 Cat's Waltz TV as Lucya-Sandra
 2007 Mermaid as Alice Titova
 2008 The Brothers Karamazov (TV Series) as Liza Hohlakova
 2008 The Revenge TV as Polina, daughter Nina
 2008 Nirvana as Val
 2009 Jolly Fellows as Sasha
 2009 Bride at any Cost as Karina
 2009 Close the gates as Lena
 2012 Dialogues
 2012 Mothers (novel "Operation M") as the cook boss
 2012 I'll be there as Inna
 2012 Feast of locked as Nastya Kedrova
 2013 Women on the Verge as Tonya Sharkova
 2014 Devils (TV Series) as Maria Timofeevna Lebyadkina
 2014 Rather, "Moscow-Russia" as the seller of seeds
 2015 Concerned or Hal as Alexandera Gvozdikova
 2015 Rodina (TV series) as Yulia Laar
 2015 Without Borders as Masha, an employee of the border service
 2015 About Love as Lena
 2016 Red bracelets (TV series) as Yulia, sister of Oleg
 2017 Blockbaster as Dasha
 2020 Has Anyone Seen My Girl? as Liza
 2023 Clipmakers as Tonya Vodkina

References

External links

1981 births
Living people
Russian film actresses
Russian television actresses
Recipients of the Nika Award
Actresses from Moscow